Elmir Jukić (born 1971) is a Bosnian film director and screenwriter.

He graduated from the directing department at the Academy of Performing Arts in Sarajevo in 1993. One of Jukić's most distinguished works as a director is the popular Bosnian sitcom Lud, zbunjen, normalan.

Filmography

As actor

Film

Television

As director and writer

Film

Television

References

External links

1971 births
Living people
Film people from Sarajevo
Bosniaks of Bosnia and Herzegovina
Bosnia and Herzegovina film directors